Fred Zharoff (October 9, 1944 – February 6, 2001) was an American educator and politician.

Zharoff was born in Kodiak, Alaska and graduated from Kodiak High School in 1963. He served in the Alaska Army National Guard and worked in commercial fishing. Zharoff graduated from University of Alaska Fairbanks in 1971 and taught at Kodiak High School in Kodiak. Zharoff served in the Alaska House of Representatives from 1979 to 1984 and in the Alaska Senate from 1985 to 1996. He was a Democrat. He died at his home in Kodiak, Alaska.

Notes

1944 births
2001 deaths
People from Kodiak, Alaska
Alaska National Guard personnel
University of Alaska Fairbanks alumni
Educators from Alaska
Democratic Party members of the Alaska House of Representatives
Native American state legislators in Alaska
Democratic Party Alaska state senators
20th-century American politicians